Anthony Elmer Charles Hemmerling (May 15, 1914 — May 23, 1983) was a Canadian professional ice hockey player who played 24 games in the National Hockey League with the New York Americans between 1936 and 1937. The rest of his career, which lasted from 1929 to 1947, was spent in various minor leagues. Hemmerling was born in Landis, Saskatchewan.

Career statistics

Regular season and playoffs

External links

1914 births
1983 deaths
Buffalo Bisons (AHL) players
Calgary Tigers players
Canadian expatriate ice hockey players in the United States
Canadian ice hockey left wingers
Dallas Texans (USHL) players
Fresno Falcons players
Ice hockey people from Saskatchewan
New Haven Eagles players
New York Americans players
Pittsburgh Hornets players
Providence Reds players
Rochester Cardinals players
Saskatoon Quakers players
Seattle Seahawks (ice hockey) players